is a  mountain in Sasayama, Hyōgo Prefecture, Japan. Another name is Mount Kosen-ji, literally, "Mountain of Kosen-ji."

Religion and History 

Mount Matsuo is one of the major objects of worships for the people in this area. On this mountain, a Buddhist temple named ‘Kosen-ji’ was established in 645 by Hodo Sennin. This temple was re-established by Denkyo Taishi in the 9th century. The temple was burned by Akechi Mitsuhide in the 16th century, but re-established again by Toyotomi Hideyoshi. In the Edo period, it is said that there were 28 monk houses in the mountain.
Kosen-ji was also destroyed as a result of the Shinbutsu bunri, literally, Shinto-Buddhism-separation.

Sakai Castle once stood on the top of this mountain; however, it was destroyed after the decline of the Sakai clan.

Access 
 Furuichi Station of Fukuchiyama Line
 Sasayamaguchi Station of Fukuchiyama Line

References
 the Geographical Survey Institute in Japan
 ‘Shinban Furusato Hyogo 50 San’, Hyōgoken Sangaku Renmei

Matsuo